Tommy Höglund (born 2 April 1961) is a Swedish biathlete. He competed in the relay event at the 1984 Winter Olympics.

References

1961 births
Living people
Swedish male biathletes
Olympic biathletes of Sweden
Biathletes at the 1984 Winter Olympics
People from Dalarna